The 2002–03 NBA season was the 36th season of the franchise, 30th in San Antonio, and 27th in the National Basketball Association. This was also the Spurs' first season playing at the SBC Center (now AT&T Center). During the off-season, the team signed free agents Kevin Willis, acquired second-year guard Speedy Claxton from the Philadelphia 76ers, and re-acquired former Spurs guard and three-point specialist Steve Kerr from the Portland Trail Blazers. Argentinian future star Manu Ginóbili, who was drafted by the team in 1999, would make his debut for his first NBA season. This would also be the fourteenth and final season for former All-Star center, and long-time Spurs star David Robinson. The Spurs played strong basketball, posting a nine-game winning streak at midseason, holding a 33–16 record at the All-Star break, then winning eleven straight games near the end of the season. The Spurs would win 60 games for only the second time in franchise history, finishing with a league-best 60–22 record.

The season saw Tim Duncan earn his second consecutive NBA MVP Award, averaging 23.3 points, 12.9 rebounds and 2.9 blocks per game. He was named to the All-NBA First Team, the NBA All-Defensive First Team, and was selected for the 2003 NBA All-Star Game. In addition, second-year guard Tony Parker showed improvement, averaging 15.5 points and 5.3 assists per game, while Stephen Jackson provided the team with 11.8 points and 1.6 steals per game, and sixth man Malik Rose contributed 10.4 points and 6.4 rebounds per game off the bench. Robinson averaged 8.5 points, 7.9 rebounds and 1.7 blocks per game, which were career lows, while Ginóbili contributed 7.6 points per game off the bench, and was named to the NBA All-Rookie Second Team, and Bruce Bowen provided with 7.1 points per game, and was named to the NBA All-Defensive Second Team. Head coach Gregg Popovich was named Coach of the Year. Duncan also finished in fourth place in Defensive Player of the Year voting, while Parker finished in fourth place in Most Improved Player voting. This season marked the official beginning of the Big Three era, and the end of the Twin Towers era. The trio of Duncan, Parker, and Ginóbili would lead the Spurs to win 3 more championships (2005, 2007, and 2014).

In the Western Conference First Round of the playoffs, the Spurs defeated the Phoenix Suns in six games after losing Game 1 in overtime, then defeated the defending three-time NBA champion Los Angeles Lakers in the Western Conference Semi-finals in six games. In the Western Conference Finals, they defeated the Dallas Mavericks in six games to advance to the NBA Finals, where they beat the New Jersey Nets in six games and won their second championship, their first title since 1999 NBA Finals. Following the season, Jackson signed as a free agent with the Atlanta Hawks, while Steve Smith signed with the New Orleans Hornets, and Robinson, Kerr and Danny Ferry all retired.

For the season, the Spurs changed their primary logo, adding black and silver colors, and slightly changed their uniforms. The primary logo remained in use until 2017, while the uniforms lasted until 2010.

NBA Draft

Roster

Regular season

Standings

Record vs. opponents

Game log

October
Record: 1–1; Home: 0–1; Road: 1–0

November
Record: 10–6; Home: 6–2; Road: 4–4

December
Record: 8–6; Home: 5–1; Road: 3–5

January
Record: 11–3; Home: 5–1; Road: 6–2

February
Record: 9–1; Home: 3–0; Road: 6–1

March
Record: 14–3; Home: 9–3; Road: 5–0

April
Record: 7–2; Home: 3–1; Road: 6–1

Playoffs

|- align="center" bgcolor="#ffcccc"
| 1
| April 19
| Phoenix
| L 95–96 (OT)
| Stephen Jackson (23)
| Tim Duncan (13)
| Tony Parker (7)
| SBC Center19,217
| 0–1
|- align="center" bgcolor="#ccffcc"
| 2
| April 21
| Phoenix
| W 84–76
| Stephen Jackson (23)
| Tim Duncan (12)
| Speedy Claxton (7)
| SBC Center19,217
| 1–1
|- align="center" bgcolor="#ccffcc"
| 3
| April 25
| @ Phoenix
| W 99–86
| Tony Parker (29)
| Tim Duncan (23)
| Tim Duncan (6)
| America West Arena19,023
| 2–1
|- align="center" bgcolor="#ffcccc"
| 4
| April 27
| @ Phoenix
| L 84–86
| Tim Duncan (24)
| Tim Duncan (11)
| Manu Ginóbili (5)
| America West Arena18,756
| 2–2
|- align="center" bgcolor="#ccffcc"
| 5
| April 29
| Phoenix
| W 94–82
| Malik Rose (27)
| Tim Duncan (17)
| Tim Duncan (6)
| SBC Center19,217
| 3–2
|- align="center" bgcolor="#ccffcc"
| 6
| May 1
| @ Phoenix
| W 87–85
| Stephen Jackson (21)
| Tim Duncan (20)
| Tim Duncan (10)
| America West Arena18,913
| 4–2
|-

|- align="center" bgcolor="#ccffcc"
| 1
| May 5
| L.A. Lakers
| W 87–82
| Tim Duncan (28)
| David Robinson (11)
| Tim Duncan (7)
| SBC Center18,797
| 1–0
|- align="center" bgcolor="#ccffcc"
| 2
| May 7
| L.A. Lakers
| W 114–95
| Bruce Bowen (27)
| Tim Duncan (13)
| Tim Duncan (7)
| SBC Center18,797
| 2–0
|- align="center" bgcolor="#ffcccc"
| 3
| May 9
| @ L.A. Lakers
| L 95–110
| Tim Duncan (28)
| Tim Duncan (11)
| Jackson, Parker (4)
| Staples Center18,997
| 2–1
|- align="center" bgcolor="#ffcccc"
| 4
| May 11
| @ L.A. Lakers
| L 95–99
| Tim Duncan (36)
| Stephen Jackson (10)
| Tim Duncan (5)
| Staples Center18,997
| 2–2
|- align="center" bgcolor="#ccffcc"
| 5
| May 13
| L.A. Lakers
| W 96–94
| Tim Duncan (27)
| Tim Duncan (14)
| Tim Duncan (5)
| SBC Center18,797
| 3–2
|- align="center" bgcolor="#ccffcc"
| 6
| May 15
| @ L.A. Lakers
| W 110–82
| Tim Duncan (37)
| Tim Duncan (16)
| Tony Parker (5)
| Staples Center18,997
| 4–2
|-

|- align="center" bgcolor="#ffcccc"
| 1
| May 19
| Dallas
| L 110–113
| Tim Duncan (40)
| Tim Duncan (15)
| Tim Duncan (7)
| SBC Center18,797
| 0–1
|- align="center" bgcolor="#ccffcc"
| 2
| May 21
| Dallas
| W 119–106
| Tim Duncan (32)
| Tim Duncan (15)
| Duncan, Jackson (5)
| SBC Center18,797
| 1–1
|- align="center" bgcolor="#ccffcc"
| 3
| May 23
| @ Dallas
| W 96–83
| Tim Duncan (34)
| Tim Duncan (24)
| Tim Duncan (6)
| American Airlines Center20,695
| 2–1
|- align="center" bgcolor="#ccffcc"
| 4
| May 25
| @ Dallas
| W 102–95
| Tony Parker (25)
| Tim Duncan (20)
| Tim Duncan (7)
| American Airlines Center20,561
| 3–1
|- align="center" bgcolor="#ffcccc"
| 5
| May 27
| Dallas
| L 91–103
| Tim Duncan (23)
| Tim Duncan (15)
| three players tied (6)
| SBC Center18,797
| 3–2
|- align="center" bgcolor="#ccffcc"
| 6
| May 29
| @ Dallas
| W 90–78
| Stephen Jackson (24)
| Duncan, Rose (11)
| three players tied (4)
| American Airlines Center20,812
| 4–2
|-

|- align="center" bgcolor="#ccffcc"
| 1
| June 4
| New Jersey
| W 101–89
| Tim Duncan (32)
| Tim Duncan (20)
| Tim Duncan (6)
| SBC Center18,797
| 1–0
|- align="center" bgcolor="#ffcccc"
| 2
| June 6
| New Jersey
| L 85–87
| Tony Parker (21)
| Tim Duncan (12)
| Tony Parker (5)
| SBC Center18,797
| 1–1
|- align="center" bgcolor="#ccffcc"
| 3
| June 8
| @ New Jersey
| W 84–79
| Tony Parker (26)
| Tim Duncan (16)
| Tim Duncan (7)
| Continental Airlines Arena19,280
| 2–1
|- align="center" bgcolor="#ffcccc"
| 4
| June 11
| @ New Jersey
| L 76–77
| Tim Duncan (23)
| Tim Duncan (16)
| Parker, Jackson (3)
| Continental Airlines Arena19,280
| 2–2
|- align="center" bgcolor="#ccffcc"
| 5
| June 13
| @ New Jersey
| W 93–83
| Tim Duncan (29)
| Tim Duncan (17)
| Duncan, Parker (4)
| Continental Airlines Arena19,280
| 3–2
|- align="center" bgcolor="#ccffcc"
| 6
| June 15
| New Jersey
| W 88–77
| Tim Duncan (21)
| Tim Duncan (20)
| Tim Duncan (10)
| SBC Center18,797
| 4–2
|-

Player stats

Regular season

Playoffs

NBA Finals

Summary
The following scoring summary is written in a line score format, except that the quarter numbers are replaced by game numbers.

Schedule
Game 1 – June 4: Wednesday 8:00pm EST @San Antonio San Antonio 101, New Jersey 89: San Antonio leads series 1–0
Game 2 – June 6: Friday 8:00pm EST @San Antonio New Jersey 87, San Antonio 85: Series tied 1–1
Game 3 – June 8: Sunday 8:00pm EST @New Jersey San Antonio 84, New Jersey 79: San Antonio leads series 2–1
Game 4 – June 11: Wednesday 8:00pm EST @New Jersey New Jersey 77, San Antonio 76: Series tied 2–2
Game 5 – June 13: Friday 8:00pm EST @New Jersey San Antonio 93, New Jersey 83: San Antonio leads series 3–2
Game 6 – June 15 Sunday 8:00pm EST @San Antonio San Antonio 88, New Jersey 77: San Antonio wins series 4–2

Award winners
Tim Duncan, NBA Most Valuable Player Award
Tim Duncan, NBA Finals Most Valuable Player Award
Gregg Popovich, NBA Coach of the Year Award
Tim Duncan, All-NBA First Team
Tim Duncan, NBA All-Defensive First Team
Bruce Bowen, NBA All-Defensive Second Team
Manu Ginóbili, NBA All-Rookie Second Team

Transactions

Overview

Player Transactions Citation:

References

 San Antonio Spurs on Database Basketball
 San Antonio Spurs on Basketball Reference

 

San Antonio Spurs seasons
NBA championship seasons
San
Western Conference (NBA) championship seasons
San Antonio
San Antonio